Album is the third studio album by Joan Jett and the second to feature her backing band the Blackhearts. It was released in July 1983.

Background and recording
Unlike Joan Jett's two previous albums, only two tracks are cover songs, and a re-recording of a the Runaways "I Love Playing With Fire", though this had not been the original plan. During the recording of the album, Jett commented, "I know what's going to happen. When we included lots of covers, people would call us on it. If we don't they'd say, 'Where's the covers?'"

Release
The cassette tape version had 2 different issues, one issued in a regular black plastic case (MCA MCAC-5437) and one issued in a red plastic case (MCA MCAC-5445). The initial version contained The Rolling Stones song "Star Star" on it as a hidden track at the end of side one. The second version deleted the song and was designated as "Album Version Only". The album was re-released in 1992 with six more bonus tracks.

The first single released from the album was the lead track "Fake Friends". The U.S. 7-inch vinyl featured "Nitetime" on the reverse side, with a locked groove at the end of the song. This meant that jukeboxes playing the track would have to be manually rejected. The CD bonus track "Locked Groove" is an actual recording of the end of the single. A second issue with "Handyman" as the B-side was sent to distributors. A video was shot for "Fake Friends" where Joan and the Blackhearts are continually mobbed by 'fans' and hangers-on who quickly turn into cardboard cut-outs and fall over. It received heavy airplay on MTV, though the song was a relative disappointment on the Billboard Hot 100, peaking at number 35. Kenny Laguna later told Creem magazine that he had objected to "Fake Friends" being the first single, as it wasn't a natural fit for rock radio, but was rebuffed by the label.

The second single, "Everyday People" (backed with "Why Can't We Be Happy") fared no better, peaking at number 37. The release was accompanied by a slapstick video in which Jett is plagued by calamity, including a smoking hair-dryer, a defective alarm clock, and a collapsing bed. Promotional 7-inch and 12-inch records of the song were sent to radio stations featuring the longer "Dance Mix."; and the commercial 12-inch record featured the notorious "Star Star" on the B-side.

A third video was filmed for "The French Song", but MTV gave it scant airtime and a single was only released in Canada, where it was backed with "Coney Island Whitefish".

Track listing

Personnel

The Blackhearts
 Joan Jett – lead vocals, rhythm guitar
 Ricky Byrd – lead guitar, backing vocals
 Gary Ryan – bass, backing vocals
 Lee Crystal – drums, backing vocals

Additional musicians
The Uptown Horns:
Crispin Choe – baritone sax
Robert Funk – trombone
Arno Hecht – tenor sax
Paul Litteral – trumpet
The Ross Levinson Strings directed by Ross Levinson
Kenny Laguna – keyboards, backing vocals

Production
Ritchie Cordell, Kenny Laguna – production
Greg Kolotkin – associate production
Ron Cote – engineering
Bob Ludwig – mastering

Design
Album design – Spencer Drate, Judith Salavetz
Art direction – Meryl Laguna, Joan Jett
Photography – Dieter Zill

Charts

Certifications

References

1983 albums
Albums with cover art by Mick Rock
Blackheart Records albums
Epic Records albums
Joan Jett albums
Warner Records albums